Queer Creek may refer to:

Queer Creek (Alaska), a stream in Matanuska-Susitna Borough
Queer Creek (Montana), a tributary to the Vermilion River
Queer Creek (Ohio), a stream in Hocking County